Monika Absolonová (born 27 September 1976) is a Czech singer and actress. She released her first album, Monika, in 1993. In 2002, she performed the title role in the famous Czech musical, Kleopatra, at Prague's Broadway Theatre. Absolonová performed her first solo concert in Prague's Broadway Theatre in 2010. She took part in the Czech version of Dancing with the Stars in 2010. The same year Absolonová was among the headliners for a concert in Prague's Old Town Square to support the victims of the 2010 Haiti earthquake. In 2013, she became the Czech singing voice of Elsa in Frozen.

Discography

Studio albums
1993: Monika
1999: První Den
2001: Jsem Nevěrná
2004: Zůstávám Dál
2010: Muzikálové Album
2016: Až do nebes

References

External links

1976 births
Living people
People from Benešov
21st-century Czech women singers
Czech musical theatre actresses
Recipients of the Thalia Award